Kali Kola (also Romanized as Kālī Kolā and Kālī Kalā; also known as Kārī Kolā) is a village in Lafur Rural District, North Savadkuh County, Mazandaran Province, Iran. At the 2006 census, its population was 772, in 194 families.

References 

Populated places in Savadkuh County